139 (One hundred [and] thirty-nine) is the natural number following 138 and preceding 140.

In mathematics
139 is the 34th prime number. It is a twin prime with 137. Because 141 is a semiprime, 139 is a Chen prime. 139 is the smallest prime before a prime gap of length 10.

This number is the sum of five consecutive prime numbers (19 + 23 + 29 + 31 + 37).

It is the smallest factor of 64079  which is the smallest Lucas number with prime index which is not prime. It is also the smallest factor of the first nine terms of the Euclid–Mullin sequence, making it the tenth term.

139 is a happy number and a strictly non-palindromic number.

In the military
 RUM-139 VL-ASROC is a United States Navy ASROC anti-submarine missile
  was a United States Navy Admirable-class minesweeper during World War II
  was a United States Navy Haskell-class attack transport during World War II
  was a United States Navy destroyer during World War II
  was a United States Navy transport ship during World War I and World War II
  was a tanker loaned to the Soviet Union during World War II, then returned to the United States in 1944
  was a United States Navy cargo ship during World War II
  was a United States Navy Des Moines-class heavy cruiser following World War II
  was a United States Navy Wickes-class destroyer during World War II

In transportation
 British Rail Class 139 is the TOPS classification assigned to the lightweight railcars by West Midlands Trains on the Stourbridge Town Branch Line
 Fiat M139 platform is the next-generation premium rear wheel drive automobile platform from Fiat
 London Buses route 139 is a Transport for London contracted bus route in London

In other fields
139 is also:
 The year AD 139 or 139 BC
 139 AH is a year in the Islamic calendar that corresponds to 756 – 757 CE.
 139 Juewa is a large and dark main belt asteroid discovered in 1874
 The atomic number of untriennium, an unsynthesized chemical element
 Gull Lake No. 139 is a rural municipality in Saskatchewan, Canada
 Sonnet 139 by William Shakespeare
 139 Rb Gahhie is a village in Chak Jhumra Tehsil in the Punjab province of Pakistan
 Miss 139 was a 1921 film starring Diana Allen and Marc McDermott
 Motorola C139 model cellphone

See also
 List of highways numbered 139
 M139 (disambiguation)
 United Nations Security Council Resolution 139
 United States Supreme Court cases, Volume 139

References

External links

 Psalm 139

Integers